See-Bar, also known as God Father is a 1980 Hong Kong action comedy film directed by Dennis Yu in his directorial debut and starring Chow Yun-fat, Dorothy Yu, Roy Chiao and Pai Ying.

Plot
Kit (Chow Yun-fat) works at his uncle, Ching's (Ng Wui) car repair shop. Due to his reckless personality, Kit engages in a motorcycle race against a rascal, Q (Lau Kwok-shing), and wrecks Q's bike, much to the dissatisfaction of the latter. As a result, Q and his acquaintances retaliate by wrecking Ching's repair shop and towing the vehicles away.

To get even with Q, Kit goes to an underground casino owned by triads hoping to use swindling skills which he learned from his godfather, Kan (Chiang Nan), to win a large sum of money. Kan was one of the Double Supreme Conmen of Shanghai, but have gone anonymous after being tired of jinag hu affairs. Kan advises against Kit from going to the casino, but Kit goes anyway wanting to help his uncle. However, Kit's swindling skills backfired and as a result, he owed a large debt.

Q's boss, Kwok Sin (Pai Ying), is a businessman who manages a financial company on the surface, but in actuality, he is a triad member who secretly operates business in prostitution, gambling and drugs. To force Kit to pay his debts, Kwok ordered his underlings to destroy his uncle's repair shop. Seeing his uncle's effort of many years being destroyed, Kit goes to his godfather for help, who promises to help him by asking Kit to search for his old partner, Chu Tung-san (Roy Chiao).

Chu Tong-san has changed to name to Chu Kam-tau. As the Double Supreme Conmen of Shanghai re-met after many years, they both sigh about the past. Chu decides to help Kit by setting up a scam involving a major trading business. The greedy Kwok wants to join in. Chu and Kit uses a counter strategy to scam Kwok by snatching a case of cash from Kwok during the trade. Kwok gives chases but fails to do so. Kwok, who is hunted by his boss, Mr. Mo (Tam Tin-nam), for losing all his money, attempts to rob a bank with his underlings but was captured by the police. Kit, who finally took his revenge, comes to visit Kwok in prison and mocks him in joy.

Cast
Chow Yun-fat as Kit
Dorothy Yu as Mei
Roy Chiao as Ghost Eye Chu Tung-san
Pai Ying as Kwok Sin
Wong Ching as Yuen the smuggler
Chiang Nan as Kan
Ng Wui as Uncle Ching
Steve Lee as Kit's cousin
Alexander Chan
Hon Lai-fan as Biker firl
Lau Nga-lai as Yan's daughter
Chiang Kam as Mechanic
Yeung Yau-cheung as Government official
Mok Chui-yan
Bruce Mang as Q's buddy
Stephen Wong
Tam Tin-nam as Mr. Mo
Lau Kwok-shing as Q
Sau Lee-sam
Pong Cheuk-lam as Yan
Homer Cheung as One of Mr. Mo's men
Wong Chik-sam as Mr. Ngok
Hung Fung as One of Mr. Mo's men
Fo Yi
Lee Wai-mui
Chui Wan-sang
Fung Yun-chuen
Nam Wai as Thug

Theme song
Aspire to Travel Far (志在四方)
Composer: Joseph Koo
Lyricist: Thomas Tang
Singer: Roman Tam

Critical reception
So Good Reviews gave the film a negative review criticizing its lack of interest, humor and excitement with only a sole funny scene.

See also
Chow Yun-fat filmography

References

External links

See-Bar at Hong Kong Cinemagic

1980 films
1980s action comedy films
Hong Kong action comedy films
Films about gambling
1980s Cantonese-language films
Hong Kong films about revenge
Films set in Hong Kong
Films shot in Hong Kong
1980 directorial debut films
1980 comedy films
1980s Hong Kong films